CFSM-FM (107.5 FM, 107.5 2Day FM) is a radio station in Cranbrook, British Columbia. Owned by Vista Radio, it broadcasts a hot adult contemporary format targeting the Kootenay region of British Columbia.

History 
The station was approved by the Canadian Radio-television and Telecommunications Commission on July 29, 2014. It launched on September 11, 2015 as adult contemporary Summit 107.

In December 2018, Vista Radio purchased Clear Sky Radio's remaining stations, including CFSM-FM. In August 2019, the station re-launched as 107.5 2Day FM, with a modern adult contemporary format featuring a mix of pop and rock hits.

Rebroadcasters

References

External links

CFSM-FM history - Canadian Communication Foundation

FSM
FSM
Radio stations established in 2015
FSM
2015 establishments in British Columbia